Jack 'Cracker' Knight (21 November 1912 – 17 July 1976) was an Australian rules footballer who played with Collingwood and both played for and coached St Kilda in the Victorian Football League (VFL).

A ruckman from South Bendigo, Knight wasn't selected in Collingwood's 1935 premiership team despite playing in the Preliminary Final. He made up for it by participating in the 1936 Grand Final, where he played in a forward pocket and kicked a goal in the win. Disappointment followed in 1937 when a six-week suspension for striking Ron Baggott of Melbourne in the Prelim cost him another Grand Final place but he would appear in the next two season's premiership deciders. Knight transferred to St Kilda in 1941 as captain-coach but the club struggled and although he stayed on for another season, it was as a player only.

References

Holmesby, Russell and Main, Jim (2007). The Encyclopedia of AFL Footballers. 7th ed. Melbourne: Bas Publishing.

External links

1912 births
1976 deaths
St Kilda Football Club coaches
Australian rules footballers from Victoria (Australia)
Collingwood Football Club players
Collingwood Football Club Premiership players
St Kilda Football Club players
South Bendigo Football Club players
One-time VFL/AFL Premiership players